Göllü may refer to:

 Göllü, Ağaçören, village in Aksaray Province, Turkey
 Göllü Dağ, lava dome in Turkey
 Arzu Göllü, Turkish volleyball player
 Göllü, Narman

Turkish-language surnames